The Breton and French Catholic diocese of Dol existed from 848 to the French Revolution. It was suppressed by the Concordat of 1801. Its see was Dol Cathedral. Its scattered territory (deriving from the holdings of the Celtic monastery, and including an enclave at the mouth of the Seine) was shared  mainly by the Diocese of Rennes and the Diocese of Saint-Brieuc.

History
The Life of St. Samson, which cannot be of earlier date than the seventh century, mentions the foundation of the monastery of Dol by St. Samson. He was doubtless already a bishop when he came from Great Britain to Armorica, and it is he perhaps who assisted at the Council of Paris between 561 and 567. But in the biography there is nothing to prove that he founded the See of Dol or that he was its first bishop.

In the twelfth century, to support its claim against the Metropolitan of Tours, the Church of Dol produced the names of a long list of archbishops: St. Samson, St. Magloire, St. Budoc, St. Génevée, St. Restoald, St. Armel, St. Jumael, St. Turian. Louis Duchesne discounted and doubted this list. He was of the opinion that the abbey of Dol may have had at its head from time to time abbots with episcopal jurisdiction, but that Dol was not the seat of a diocese.

Under Charlemagne and Louis the Pious, the Vicariate of Dol and the monastery of St. Méen were still included in the Diocese of Aleth; so that the first Bishop of Dol was Festianus (Festgen) mentioned for the first time between 851 and 857, and installed by King Nomenoë. Among the bishops of Dol are:

Baudri (1107–30), author of a poem on the conquest of England by William the Conqueror
Alain de Coëtivy (1456–74), as legate of Callistus III, brought Charles VII to assist the Greeks against the Turks who were besieging Constantinople
Urban René de Hercé (1767–95), emigrated to England during the Revolution, but accompanied to Brittany the royalist troops who attempted to land at Quiberon. He was arrested with his brother, and shot at Vannes, 3 July 1795.

There was a struggle from the ninth to the eleventh century to free the Church of Brittany from the Metropolitan of Tours. From a comparison made by Duchesne between the Life of St. Conwoïon, the Indiculus de episcoporum Britonum depositione, and an almost completely restored letter of Pope Leo IV, it would appear that shortly before 850, Nomenoë wishing to be anointed king, and finding opposition among the prelates of Brittany, sought to get rid of them by charging them with simony. Their only fault was perhaps that they demanded eulogia from their priests when the latter came to synods. After listening to a deputation of Breton bishops and to St. Conwoïon, founder of the Abbey of St-Sauveur at Redon, who had been sent to Rome by Nomenoë, Leo IV declared that the charge of simony must be adjudicated by a competent tribunal of twelve bishops, and must be attested by seventy-two witnesses, thereby disputing Nomenoë's claim to a right to depose bishops. But Nomenoë did depose, and in a brutal manner, the four bishops of Vannes, Aleth, Quimper, and St. Pol de Léon, and made seven dioceses out of their four. One of the new dioceses had its seat in the abbey of Dol and became straightway an archdiocese. The remaining two were in the monasteries of St. Brieuc and Pabu-Tutual (Tréguier).

At the end of 850 or beginning of 851 the bishops of the four provinces of Tours, Sens, Reims, and Rouen, wrote a letter of reprimand to Nomenoë and threatened him with excommunication. He paid no heed to them and died 7 March, 851. Salomon, Nomenoë's second successor, requested Pope Benedict IV in vain to regularize the situation of the Breton hierarchy. In the name of the Council of Savonnières (859) the seven metropolitans of the three kingdoms of Charles the Bald, of Lothair II, and of Charles of Provence, wrote to the Bishop of Rennes and to the bishops occupying the new Sees of Dol, St. Brieuc, and Tréguier, reproaching them with lack of obedience to the Metropolitan of Tours. This letter was not sent to the Bishops of Vannes, Quimper, Aleth, and St. Pol de Léon who wrongly occupied the sees of the legitimate bishops illegally deposed by Nomenoë. It achieved nothing.

In 862 Salomon dealt directly with Pope Nicholas I, and at first tried to mislead the pope by means of false allegations and forgeries; then he restored Felix of Quimper and Liberalis of Léon to their sees, but still kept Susannus of Vannes and Salocon of Aleth in exile. Nicholas I died in 867. Pope Adrian II (867-72) and Pope John VIII (872-82) continued to uphold the rights of the Metropolitan of Tours. Then came the deaths of Salomon and of Susannus, and a conciliatory mood developed.

There was no formal act on the part of the Holy See recognizing Dol as a new metropolitan church; it never had control over Rennes or Nantes, and it was mainly over the new Sees of St. Brieuc and Tréguier that it exercised ascendancy. Finally in May, 1199, Pope Innocent III restored the old order of things, and subordinated anew all Brittany to Tours but did not interfere with the diocesan boundaries set up by Nomenoë, and they remained in force until the Revolution. The Bishop of Dol retained until 1789 the insignia of an archbishop, but without an archbishop's privileges.

Bishops

To 1000

 548?: Samson of Dol
c. 567?: Magloire
c. 568?: Budoc
 Geneve
End of the 6th century.: Leucher or Leucherus
7th century.: Tiernmael or Tigerinomal
c. 640: Restoald
c. 650: Wral
c. 700: Turiau, Thuriau or Thurian
Geneve
Restoald
Armael
c. 770: Jumel, Jumael or Junemenus
c. 842: Haelrit
c. 848: Salacon or Salocon
c. 859: Fastarius or Festinianus
c. 878: Mayn I.
Lowenan
c. 930: Agano
c. 950–952: Jutohen, Juthoven or Wichoen
c. 990: Mayn II

1000 to 1300

c. 1030–1032: Jungoneus
 1040 to c. 1076: Juhel
c. 1076: Gilduin
 1076 to 17. November 1081: Ivon
 1082 to c. 1092: Johannes I.
c. 1093 to c. 1100: Roland I.
c. 1106: Johannes II.
c. 1107: Ulgrin or Vulgrin
 24 November 1107 to 6 January 1130: Baldric of Dol (:fr:Baudri de Bourgueil)
 1130 to 1146: Geoffroi Le Roux (:fr:Geoffroi Le Roux)
c. 1147 to 1154: Olivier
 1154–1161: Hugues Le Roux (:fr:Hugues Le Roux (archevêque))
 1161–1163: Roger du Homet (:fr:Roger du Homet)
 1163 to c. 1177: Jean III.
 1177 to c. 1187: Rolandus II.
c. 1187–1188: Henri I.
 1189–1190: Jean IV. de Vaulnoise
 1190–1199: Jean V. de La Mouche. His toponym suggests he may have been a kinsman of the de Subligny.
c. 1200 (probably 1203) to 13 November 1231: Jean VI. de Lizaunet, also known as John (VI) de Lysenach
 1231 to c. 1242: Clément de Coetquen
c. 1242 to 16. November 1265: Etienne I.
 1266 to 13. May 1279: Jean VII. Mahé

1300 to 1500

 1280 to 30. March 1301: Thibaud I. de Pouencé
 1301–1312: Thibaud II. de Moréac
 1312 to 25. January 1324: Jean VIII. du Bosc
 1324 to 15. March 1328: Guillaume I. Meschin
 1328 to 8. May 1340: Jean IX. d'Avaugour
 1340 to c. 1350: Henri II. Dubois
c. 1350 to c. 1357: Simon Le Mayre
c. 1358 to 16. March 1366: Nicolas
 1366 or 1367–1373: Jean X. des Pas
 1373 or 1374 to c. 1377: Geoffroi II. de Coëtmoisan
c. 1378–1381: Pierre
 1381–1382: Guy de Roye
 1382–1386: Everard de Trémignon
 27 August 1386 to 2 February 1390: Guillaume II. de Brie
 1390 to 20. May 1405: Richard de Lesmenez
 1405 to 6. December 1429: Etienne II. Cœuvret
 8. January 1431 to 1437: Jean XI. de Bruc
 11. December 1437 to 24. August 1444: Alain I. L'Epervier
 1444 to 16. April 1456: Raoul de La Moussaye
 17 June 1456 to 22. July 1474: Cardinal Alain II. de Coëtivy
 1474 to 14. January 1478: Christophe de Penmarch
 1478 to 29. March 1482: Michel Guibé
 29. March 1482 to 5. April 1504: Thomas I. James

From 1500

 12 June 1504 to 10 December 1521: Mathurin de Plédran
 1522–1524: Thomas Le Roy
 30 June 1524 to 2 July 1556: François de Laval
 25 September 1556 to 12 September 1557: Jean XII. de Matthefélon
 1558–1591: Charles d'Espinay
 1606–1629: Edmond Revol
 1630–1644: Hector Douvrier
 1645–1648: Antoine-Denis Cohon
 1653–1660: Robert Cupif
 1660–1692: Matthieu Thoreau
 1692–1702: Jean-François de Chamillart
 1702–1715: François Elie de Voyer de Paulmy d'Argenson
 1715–1748: Jean-Louis du Bouchet de Sourches
 1749–1767: Jean-François-Louis Dondel
 1767–1790: Urbain-René de Hercé

See also
 Catholic Church in France
 List of Catholic dioceses in France

References

Bibliography

Reference works
  (Use with caution; obsolete)
  (in Latin) 
 (in Latin)

Studies

Dol
Religious organizations established in the 840s
Dol
848 establishments
9th-century establishments in France
1801 disestablishments in France